Hale Centre Theatre is a theatre company headquartered in Sandy, Utah. Their mission statement is “enriching lives through world-class theatre.” In 1985, Ruth and Nathan Hale partnered with their daughter, Sally Hale Rice, and their oldest grandson, Mark Dietlein and his wife (also Sally) to start a theatre in Utah. They converted an old lingerie factory in South Salt Lake to a theatre-in-the-round with 220 seats. After a couple of expansions, they moved into a new facility in West Valley City in 1998. After selling out all 613 seats at Harman Hall on a regular basis, a new partnership was formed with Sandy City in 2017 as they opened the new home of Hale Centre Theatre at the Mountain America Performing Arts Centre.

Hale Centre Theatre provides traditional play and musical theatre productions on two state-of-the-art stages under one roof in Sandy City. The smaller Sorenson Legacy Jewel Box Stage seats 467 people; the larger Young Living Centre Stage seats 911. The Theatre has a total of 130,000 square feet and is the only professional theatre venue between Salt Lake City, a half hour to the north, and St. George, four hours to the south. It is considered to be a cultural highlight of downtown Sandy.

Hale Centre Theatre provides learning opportunities for students and individuals interested in a career in acting, production, lighting, sound, and composition. One way they give back to the community is by providing complimentary tickets to area schools around Utah to promote wholesome, exceptional theatre experiences for the rising generation. The success of this outreach has earned Hale Centre Theatre a loyal fan base of people of all ages.

Theatre in Utah 
Theatre came to Utah with pioneers of the Church of Jesus Christ of Latter-day Saints when they entered the Utah valley in the late 1840s after fleeing persecution in Nauvoo, Illinois Theatre was an important form of entertainment to the Latter-day Saints. Church president, Brigham Young, “believed the people of Utah needed a theatre before they needed a temple.”

The first theatre company in Utah, the Musical and Dramatic Company, opened in 1850. It was composed of local members of the Church, including affiliates with the Nauvoo Brass Band, which became the company’s orchestra. Attending the theatre as a form of entertainment grew rapidly in popularity among the locals because the community was isolated. Other touring theatre companies in the United States did not go as far West as Salt Lake, so the locals had to entertain themselves. However, the majority of Mormon pioneers came from overseas, particularly England, and had a great love for drama already. They attended and performed in productions enthusiastically.

In 1851, the Musical and Dramatic Company was reorganized as the Deseret Dramatic Association. The Social Hall was built in 1853 to house performances of the Association and became known as the first Little Theatre in America. Other "Social Halls" appeared throughout Utah, particularly in Mt. Pleasant, Provo, Nephi, and Cedar City.

Theatre was put on pause in Utah following the outbreak of the Utah War in 1857. Once the crisis settled, the Mechanics’ Dramatic Association was formed in 1859. Plays for this Association were performed in the home of Harry Bowring and was called Bowring’s Theatre.

The Salt Lake Theatre was built in March 1862 as a first-class theatre for Salt Lake patrons. The Social Hall could no longer hold the large numbers of patrons who wanted to attend theatre productions, making the theatre's construction a necessity. More than 1,500 people gathered for the dedication and it became known as the “Cathedral of the Desert." It was torn down in 1929.

The transcontinental railroad was completed in the late 1860s, opening travel for traveling companies from the East to come to Utah. The fame of the talent and quality of Utah performances had spread, and great actors came to participate.

By the 1890s, theater in Utah was very popular. Large newspapers such as the Deseret News, Salt Lake Tribune, and Salt Lake Herald dedicated special pages to Utah’s professional theatres.

Dramatic companies began to fade with the arrival of film in the 1900s. Utah universities and colleges then began their own theatre programs, including the University of Utah, Brigham Young University, and Southern Utah University.

Hale Center Theatre continues to give public access to the performing arts. Its newest location is the Mountain America Performing Arts Centre in Sandy. It opened November 16, 2017 with a production of Aida. Many of those who donated to build the theatre were in attendance as well as state officials, including Sandy Mayor, Tom Dolan and Utah Governor, Gary Herbert.

Ruth and Nathan Hale 
Ruth and Nathan Hale were drawn into the world of theatre because they were asked to be drama leaders in their Mormon congregation in Granger, Utah. They decided to write their own plays because they did not have the money to pay for the royalties on existing ones. Their plays gained popularity and soon they were performed in other Mormon congregations. Eventually, the Hales were invited to perform one of their plays at Brigham Young University. The evening of their first performance they received thirteen curtain calls.

During World War II, the Hales decided to move to California to find better work opportunities. Nathan Hale tried to find work at the Pasadena Playhouse, but the Playhouse only accepted actors and actresses from nearby studios and ones the company had worked with previously. The Hales went back to performing their plays for local Mormon congregations until Nathan was scouted by a talent agent.

When Nathan’s opportunity fell through, the Hales decided to start their own theatre in Glendale, California. They called it the Glendale Center. It was a small theatre which only seated a hundred and ten people, but its popularity quickly grew. Eventually, the Hales decided to go back to Granger and build another theatre by selling land left to Ruth Hale by her father and with financial assistance from their daughter and son-in-law.

Theatre became a family business for the Hales. The Hales' descendants are still in the theatre business today, running the theatres and upholding the family legacy.

Theatre Across the Nation 
A key component of understanding American theatre is the mid-twentieth century theatre movement in London that highlighted the rise of small, local theatres who were not interested in competing directly with the monopoly-like position of the West End. As these local theatres became more prevalent, they enveloped parts of local characteristics such as a region’s dialect or the character Paddy with his pet pig as a representation of the Irish.

The history of American theatre closely follows the ties to Britain. The large scale national movement in America began in 1915 when the future Theatre Guild was established in Washington D.C. Increased transportation between the British Isles and America led to more British actors in star roles in America which established cities like New York as one of the theatrical capitals of the world. With the increase in wealth generated from play production, local theatres across the nation, especially around the west coast, were able to produce their own shows in order to reach a greater audience.

Building off the success of the first main theatres in the Salt Lake valley, Utah has held a prominent position in local drama in the West where some of the most well-known actors and actresses of the late 19th and early 20th century performed like Edwin Adams, Joseph Jefferson, and Julia Dean Hayne (one of the local audience’s favorites). It was joined in the rise of local theatres in cities such as San Francisco’s The Metropolitan in 1853 and the California Theatre in 1869.

The mid-1960s was a time that saw theatre move away from the classical repertoire and seek for new ways in which to attract patrons and energize local companies. The way to compete with large-scale theatre companies and the bright light prominence of Broadway was to perform a new style of play, one that would have historical importance. The play which popularized regional theatre was The Great White Hope by Howard Sackler. After the success of The Great White Hope in Washington where it premiered, and on Broadway, the 1969-1970 theatre season saw a large increase in the percentage of new plays being performed; 15% of total performances as opposed to only 5% a few seasons before.

Introduction of the theatre-in-the-round 
The early history of the theatre-in-the-round is hard to pinpoint with complete accuracy because not many sources exist. From what can be understood, the roots of this type of theatre come from an early, primitive time before language existed. It established a foundation within society as the development of speech, acting and expression came about in places such as Ancient Greece, Rome and Europe. There are many different kinds of plays that can be performed on a theatre-in-the-round, from Elizabethan style like William Shakespeare to the musical style. Different styles would require certain adjustments in order to use the space most effectively. In addition to re-productions, there are many new plays that were written specifically to be enacted in a space such as a theatre-in-the-round.

The term “theatre-in-the-round” is a term that generally means a space where the audience surrounds the stage in some manner, although some other synonyms include arena theatre, central staging, island staging and ring theatre. The stage can be any size or shape. Acting is a social equation with only two essential components: actors who start the drama and the audience who receives it. In order to make the theatre-going experience more meaningful, not just to the younger generation but to the adults as well, there was a need to reconsider the ingredients of the industry and move away from the big lights and stages. Placing the audience around the story of the production not only increases the intimacy of the performance but also helps the audience feel more invested and involved in the outcome.

Impact of Musical Theatre 

The Hale Center Theatre produces many types of performances each season including revivals of famous or local favorites and providing a mix of musical with traditional theatre. With their new, state-of-the-art facility housing two theatre spaces, there is more capacity to include more 'popular' styles in their repertoire, especially ones that have greater uses for lighting, videos and pre-existing mediums outside the theatre. This has appealed to younger audiences and has continued a 200 year tradition of American musical theatre as a mix of traditional drama and modern music. Examples of these performances include Joseph and the Amazing Technicolor Dream Coat (performed in 2017), The Scarlet Pimpernel Musical (2018) and The Heart of Robin Hood (2017). With increased performances accompanying greater demand, more expansive advertising methods have been used to maintain and grow the company's local presence including press, media and print coverage on new buildings, partnerships with local companies and businesses, and promotions to schools and students.

Locations 
The legacy of Ruth and Nathan Hale is continued through the management of several other locations outside of Sandy, Utah by their children and grandchildren. These theatres are independently owned and autonomous from each other. These theatres bring quality performances to the local populations of Gilbert, Arizona, Orem, Utah and Glendale, California.

Awards and recognition 
Overall winner of Utah Best of State in "Arts & Entertainment" - 2019
Winner of Utah Best of State Award for "Professional Theatre" 2015-2020
Winner of Utah Best of State in "Arts in Education" 2005-2007, 2011-2015, 2017–2018
Winner of Utah Best of State for "Theatre Group/Director" 2005-2020

References 

Theatres in Utah